Václav Marek may refer to:

 Václav Marek (footballer) (born 1981), Czech football goalkeeper
 Václav Marek (writer) (1908–1994), Czech writer, traveller, publicist and researcher of Saami languages